Marek Sikora may refer to:

Marek Sikora (actor) (1959–1996), Polish film actor and theatre director
Marek Sikora (astronomer), Polish astronomer
Marek Sikora (ice hockey) (born 1986), Czech ice hockey player